The Big 8 Conference is an all-sport conference within the California Community College Athletic Association.

College sports in California